The Ed Sullivan Show was an American television variety show that ran on CBS from June 20, 1948, to March 28, 1971, and was hosted by New York entertainment columnist Ed Sullivan. It was replaced in September 1971 by the CBS Sunday Night Movie.

In 2002, The Ed Sullivan Show was ranked No. 15 on TV Guides 50 Greatest TV Shows of All Time. In 2013, the series finished No. 31 in TV Guide Magazine's 60 Best Series of All Time.

History

From 1948 until its cancellation in 1971, the show ran on CBS every Sunday night from 8–9 p.m. Eastern Time, and it is one of the few entertainment shows to have run in the same weekly time slot on the same network for more than two decades (during its first season, it ran from 9 to 10 p.m. ET). Virtually every type of entertainment appeared on the show; classical musicians, opera singers, popular recording artists, songwriters, comedians, ballet dancers, dramatic actors performing monologues from plays, and circus acts were regularly featured. The format was essentially the same as vaudeville and, although vaudeville had undergone a slow demise for a generation, Sullivan presented many ex-vaudevillians on his show.

Originally co-created and produced by Marlo Lewis, the show was first titled Toast of the Town, but was widely referred to as The Ed Sullivan Show for years before September 25, 1955, when that became its official name. In the show's June 20, 1948, debut, Dean Martin and Jerry Lewis performed along with singer Monica Lewis and Broadway composers Richard Rodgers and Oscar Hammerstein II previewing the score to their then-new show South Pacific, which opened on Broadway in 1949.

From 1948 through 1962, the program's primary sponsor was the Lincoln-Mercury Division of the Ford Motor Company; Sullivan read many commercials for Mercury vehicles live on the air during this period.

The Ed Sullivan Show was originally broadcast via live television from CBS-TV Studio 51, the Maxine Elliott Theatre, at Broadway and 39th Street, before moving to its permanent home at CBS-TV Studio 50 in New York City (1697 Broadway, at 53rd Street), which was renamed the Ed Sullivan Theater on the occasion of the program's 20th anniversary in June 1968. The last original Sullivan show telecast (#1068) was on March 28, 1971, with guests Melanie, Joanna Simon, Danny Davis and the Nashville Brass and Sandler and Young. It was one of many older shows with followings in undesirable key demographics that were purged from the network lineups that summer. The purge led into the Prime Time Access Rule taking effect that fall. Repeats were scheduled through June 6, 1971.

Background
Along with the new talent Sullivan booked each week, he also had recurring characters appear many times a season, such as his "Little Italian Mouse" puppet sidekick Topo Gigio, who debuted December 9, 1962, and ventriloquist Señor Wences debuted December 31, 1950. While most of the episodes aired live from New York City, the show also aired live on occasion from other nations, such as the United Kingdom, Australia, and Japan. For many years, Ed Sullivan was a national event each Sunday evening and was the first exposure for foreign performers to the American public.
On the occasion of the show's tenth anniversary telecast, Sullivan commented on how the show had changed during a June 1958 interview syndicated by the Newspaper Enterprise Association (NEA):

The show enjoyed phenomenal popularity in the 1950s and early 1960s. As had occurred with the annual telecasts of The Wizard of Oz in the 1960s and the 1970s, the family ritual of gathering around the television set to watch Ed Sullivan became almost a U.S. cultural universal. He was regarded as a kingmaker, and performers considered an appearance on his program as a guarantee of stardom, although this sometimes did not turn out to be the case. The show's status is illustrated by the song "Hymn for a Sunday Evening" from the 1960 musical Bye Bye Birdie.  In the song, a family of viewers expresses their regard for the program in worshipful tones.

In September 1965, CBS started televising the program in compatible color, as all three major networks began to switch to 100 percent color prime time schedules. CBS had once backed its own color system, developed by Peter Goldmark, and resisted using RCA's compatible process until 1954. At that time, it built its first New York City color TV studio, Studio 72, in a former RKO movie theater at 2248 Broadway (81st Street).  One Ed Sullivan Show was broadcast on August 22, 1954, from the new studio, but it was mostly used for one-time-only specials such as Rodgers and Hammerstein's March 31, 1957 Cinderella. (The facility was later acquired by TeleTape Productions and became the first studio where the PBS children's program Sesame Street was produced.) CBS Studio 72 was demolished in 1986 and replaced by an apartment house. CBS Studio 50 was finally modernized for color broadcasts in 1965. The 1965–66 season premiere starred the Beatles in an episode airing on September 12, which was the last episode to air in black and white. This occurred because the episode was taped at the Beatles' convenience on August 14, the eve of their Shea Stadium performance and a two-week tour of North America,  slightly before the program was ready for color transmission.

In the late 1960s, Sullivan remarked that his program was waning as the decade went on. He realized that to keep viewers, the best and brightest in entertainment had to be seen, or else the viewers were going to keep on changing the channel. Along with declining viewership, Ed Sullivan attracted a higher median age for the average viewer (which most sponsors found undesirable) as the seasons went on. These two factors were the reason the show was cancelled by CBS on March 16, 1971, as part of a mass cancellation of advertiser-averse programming. While Sullivan's landmark program ended without a proper finale, Sullivan produced one-off specials for CBS until his death in 1974, including an Ed Sullivan Show 25th anniversary special in 1973.

In 1990, television documentary producer Andrew Solt formed SOFA Entertainment, Inc. and purchased the exclusive rights to the complete library of The Ed Sullivan Show from Ed Sullivan's daughter Elizabeth and her husband Bob Precht. The collection consists of 1,087 hours of kinescopes and videotapes broadcast by CBS on Sunday nights from 1948 to 1971.
 
Since acquiring the rights to The Ed Sullivan Show library, SOFA Entertainment has catalogued, organized and cleared performance rights for the original shows. Starting in 1991, SOFA Entertainment has re-introduced The Ed Sullivan Show to the American public by producing numerous network specials, syndicating a half-hour series (that also aired on TV Land, PBS, VH1 and Decades) and home video compilations.  Some of these compilations include The 4 Complete Ed Sullivan Shows Starring The Beatles, All 6 Ed Sullivan Shows Starring The Rolling Stones, Elvis: The Ed Sullivan Shows, Motown Gold from the Ed Sullivan Show, Ed Sullivan's Rock 'n Roll Classics, and 115 half-hour The Best of The Ed Sullivan Show specials, among others. Performances of this show are also available as video and audio downloads and as an app on iTunes."  In 2021, MeTV began airing on Sunday nights half hour packages of performances from the show.

The Ed Sullivan Show Orchestra 
In the early years of television, both CBS and NBC networks had their own symphony orchestras. NBC's was conducted by Arturo Toscanini and CBS's by Alfredo Antonini. The Ed Sullivan Show  (originally presented as: The Toast Of The Town) was basically a musical variety show, and thus members of the CBS orchestra were folded into the Ed Sullivan Show Orchestra, conducted by Ray Bloch. During the early days of television, the demands on studio musicians were many-tiered. They needed to be proficient in all genres of music, from classical, to jazz and to rock and roll. The Ed Sullivan Show would regularly feature singers from the Metropolitan Opera and the staff orchestra would accompany divas such as Eileen Farrell, Maria Callas or Joan Sutherland. The musicians needed to be prepared to switch gears for Ella Fitzgerald, Diahann Carroll or Sammy Davis, Jr. and then onto The Jackson Five, Stevie Wonder or Tom Jones or Itzhak Perlman. They also needed to perform with some of the greatest dancers and ballerinas of the time, from Gregory Hines, Juliet Prowse, Maria Tallchief or Margo Fonteyn to the Peter Gennaro dancers.
In the process, the musicians collaborated with several internationally recognized ballet troupes including: Ruth Page's Chicago Opera Ballet, the London Festival Ballet, Roland Petit's Ballets de Paris and Russia's Igor Moiseyev Ballet.  Few musicians are capable of crossing over from one genre to another. However, each member of the Ed Sullivan Show Orchestra was a specialist and more than capable of covering the complete spectrum of music.

The lead trumpet player is the "concert master" of a studio orchestra. Chris Griffin (formerly with the trumpet section of Harry James, Ziggy Elman and the Benny Goodman Band) was Ray Bloch's lead trumpet player for the many radio and television shows that he conducted, including the Ed Sullivan Show. Chris remained the lead trumpet player with The Ed Sullivan show from the first show in 1948 to the last show in 1971. The Trumpet Section was composed of: Chris Griffin; Bernie Privin; Jimmy Nottingham and Thad Jones. Chris' son Paul Griffin was a regular substitute trumpeter. Trombones: Roland Dupont; Morton Bullman; Frank Rehak and Cliff Heather. Saxes: Toots Mondello; Hymie Schertzer; Ed Zuhlke; etc. Piano: Hank Jones. Drums: Specs Powell/Howard Smith. Percussion: Milton Schlesinger who similarly played from the first to last show. John Serry Sr. often augmented the orchestra as the lead accordionist during the 1950s. Unlike NBC's The Tonight Show, which celebrated the notoriety of their musicians in Skitch Henderson's or Doc Severinsen's "Tonight Show Band", the CBS producers of The Ed Sullivan Show decided to hide their famed musicians behind a curtain. Occasionally, CBS would broadcast specials and call upon the orchestra to perform. When Robert F. Kennedy was assassinated, music was hastily composed for the orchestra in a special tribute that also featured jazz pianist Bill Evans, who had recently composed an Elegy To His Father.

Notable performances and guests

The Ed Sullivan Show is especially known to the World War II and baby boomer generations for introducing acts and airing breakthrough performances by popular 1950s and 1960s musicians such as Elvis Presley, The Beatles, The Supremes, The Dave Clark Five, The Animals, Creedence Clearwater Revival, Dusty Springfield, The Beach Boys, The Jackson 5, Stevie Wonder, Buddy Holly, Janis Joplin, The Rolling Stones, The Mamas and the Papas, The Lovin' Spoonful, Herman's Hermits, The Doors, Dionne Warwick, Barbra Streisand, Petula Clark, and The Band.

The Canadian comedy duo Wayne and Shuster appeared on the program 67 times, a record for any performer. Bill Haley & His Comets performed their hit "Rock Around the Clock" in early August 1955, later recognized as the first rock and roll song broadcast on a national television program.

Itzhak Perlman
The American public's first exposure to Itzhak Perlman was on the show in 1958, when he was 13.  This performance was a breakthrough not only for classical music, but also for Perlman, who rode the waves of admiration to new heights of fame lasting a generation.

Elvis Presley

Initial appearance
On September 9, 1956, Presley made his first appearance on The Ed Sullivan Show (after earlier appearances on shows hosted by the Dorsey Brothers, Milton Berle, and Steve Allen), even though Sullivan had vowed never to allow Presley on the show. According to Sullivan biographer Michael David Harris, "Sullivan signed Presley when the host was having an intense Sunday-night rivalry with Steve Allen. Allen had the singer on July 1 and trounced Sullivan in the ratings. When asked to comment, [Sullivan] said that he wouldn't consider presenting Presley before a family audience. Less than two weeks later he changed his mind and signed a contract."

At the time, Presley was filming Love Me Tender, so Sullivan's producer, Marlo Lewis, flew to Los Angeles to supervise the two segments telecast that night from CBS Television City in Hollywood. Sullivan, however, was not able to host his show in New York City because he was recovering from a near fatal automobile accident. Charles Laughton guest-hosted in Sullivan's place, and opened the show. Music journalist Greil Marcus wrote that Sullivan's choice to have Elvis appear after Laughton's introduction was an attempt to make Elvis less prominent in the show.

For his first set, Elvis played "Don't Be Cruel" and "Love Me Tender". According to writer Elaine Dundy, Presley sang "Love Me Tender" "straight, subdued and tender ... —a very different Elvis from the one on The Steve Allen Show three months before". Elvis's second set consisted of "Ready Teddy" and a shortened version of "Hound Dog". Popular mythology states that Sullivan censored Presley by shooting him only from the waist up, but in fact, Presley's whole body was shown in the first and second shows.

Although Laughton was the main star and there were seven other acts on the show, Elvis was on camera for more than a quarter of the time allotted to all acts. The show had a 43.7 rating, and was viewed by a record 60,710,000 people which at the time represented an 82.6% share of the television audience, and the largest single audience in television history.  The latter percentage share, remains, to this date, the largest in the history of US television.

Second and third appearances

Sullivan hosted a second appearance by Presley on October 28, 1956. For his first segment, Elvis performed "Don't Be Cruel", then "Love Me Tender". For the second segment, Elvis sang "Love Me", and for his third, he sang a nearly four-minute-long version of "Hound Dog".

For the third and final appearance on January 6, 1957, Presley performed a medley of "Hound Dog", "Love Me Tender", and "Heartbreak Hotel", followed by a full version of "Don't Be Cruel". For a second set later in the show he sang "Too Much" and "When My Blue Moon Turns to Gold Again". For his last set he sang "Peace in the Valley". For this third appearance, it was decided to shoot the singer only from the waist while he performed. Although much has been made of the fact that Elvis was shown only from the waist up, except for the short section of "Hound Dog", all of the songs on this show were ballads.

Although Sullivan praised Elvis at the end of the show, Elvis claimed in a 1969 interview that Sullivan had expressed a very different opinion backstage: "Sullivan's standing over there saying, 'Sumbitch. The second and third appearances drew 57 and 54.6 million viewers, respectively. Years later, Sullivan tried to book Presley again, but declined after Presley's representatives presented a demanding rider.

The Beatles

In late 1963, Sullivan and his entourage happened also to be passing through Heathrow and witnessed how the Beatles' fans greeted the group on their return from Stockholm, where they had performed a television show as warmup band to local stars Suzie and Lill Babs. Sullivan was intrigued, telling his entourage it was the same thing as Elvis all over again. He initially offered Beatles manager Brian Epstein top dollar for a single show but the Beatles manager had a better idea—he wanted exposure for his clients: the Beatles would instead appear three times on the show, for only a minimal fee, but receive top billing and two spots (opening and closing) on each show.

The Beatles appeared on three consecutive Sundays in February 1964 to great anticipation and fanfare as "I Want to Hold Your Hand" had swiftly risen to No. 1 in the charts. Their first appearance on February 9 is considered a milestone in American pop culture, and furthermore the beginning of the British Invasion in music. The broadcast drew an estimated 73 million viewers, a record for US television at the time (broken three years later by the series finale of The Fugitive). The Beatles followed Ed's show opening intro, performing "All My Loving"; "Till There Was You", which featured the names of the group members superimposed on closeup shots, including the famous "SORRY GIRLS, HE'S MARRIED" caption on John Lennon; and "She Loves You". The act that followed the Beatles in the broadcast, magician Fred Kaps, was pre-recorded in order to allow time for an elaborate set change. The group returned later in the program to perform "I Saw Her Standing There" and "I Want to Hold Your Hand".

The following week's show was broadcast from Miami Beach where Cassius Clay (later known as Muhammad Ali) was in training for his first title bout with Sonny Liston. The occasion was used by both camps for publicity. On the evening of the television show (February 16) a crush of people nearly prevented the band from making it onstage. A wedge of policemen were needed and the band began playing "She Loves You" only seconds after reaching their instruments. They continued with "This Boy" and "All My Loving", then returned later to close the show with "I Saw Her Standing There", "From Me to You", and "I Want to Hold Your Hand".

They were shown on tape February 23 (this appearance had been taped earlier in the day on February 9 before their first live appearance). They followed Ed's intro with "Twist and Shout" and "Please Please Me" and closed the show once again with "I Want to Hold Your Hand".

The Beatles appeared live for the final time on August 14, 1965. The show was broadcast September 12, 1965, and earned Sullivan a 60-percent share of the nighttime audience for one of the appearances. This time they followed three acts before coming out to perform "I Feel Fine", "I'm Down", and "Act Naturally" and then closed the show with "Ticket to Ride", "Yesterday", and "Help!" Although this was their final live appearance on the show, the group provided filmed promotional clips of songs to air exclusively on Sullivan's program over the next few years, including videos of both "Paperback Writer" and "Rain" from 1966 and three clips from 1967, including "Penny Lane", "Strawberry Fields Forever", and "Hello, Goodbye." In late 1967, the group also sent a telegram to Sullivan in addition to their promotional clips, a note which the host read live on air. The group's last appearance on Sullivan's program was via prerecorded promotional clips of their songs "Two of Us" and "Let It Be", broadcast on the show on the first day of March in 1970. Although both videos were recorded in late January 1969, the delay was due to the band's dissatisfaction with the tedious Let It Be album sessions and the group's impending break-up. In all probability, the scheduling of the March 1970 broadcast was to promote the release of the band's upcoming film Let It Be in May of that year.

Black artists

The Supremes

The Supremes were a special act for The Ed Sullivan Show. In addition to 14 appearances, they were a personal favorite of Sullivan, whom he affectionately called "The Girls". Over the five years they performed on the program, the Supremes performed 15 of their hit singles, and numerous Broadway showtunes and other non-Motown songs. The group featuring the most popular lineup of Diana Ross, Mary Wilson, and Florence Ballard appeared 7 times from December 1964 through May 1967.

The group reappeared on the series in October 1967 as the newly rebilled "Diana Ross & the Supremes", with Ballard replacement Cindy Birdsong and Ross more prominently featured. The Supremes' final appearance on the show, shortly before it ended, served as the platform to introduce America to Ross's replacement, Jean Terrell, in March 1970.

Opportunity
In an era when few opportunities existed for black performers on national television, Sullivan was a champion of black talent. He launched the careers of many performers by presenting them to a nationwide TV audience and ignored the criticism. In an NEA interview, Sullivan commented:

The show included entertainers such as Frankie Lymon, The Supremes, Marian Anderson, Louis Armstrong, Pearl Bailey, LaVern Baker, Harry Belafonte, Brook Benton, James Brown (and The Famous Flames), Cab Calloway, Godfrey Cambridge, Diahann Carroll, Ray Charles, Nat King Cole, Bill Cosby, Count Basie, Dorothy Dandridge, Sammy Davis, Jr., Bo Diddley, Duke Ellington, Lola Falana, The 5th Dimension, Ella Fitzgerald, The Four Tops, Dick Gregory, W. C. Handy, Lena Horne, The Jackson 5, Mahalia Jackson, Louis Jordan, Bill Kenny, B. B. King, George Kirby, Eartha Kitt, Gladys Knight & the Pips, Little Anthony and the Imperials, Moms Mabley, Johnny Mathis, The Miracles, Melba Moore, The Platters, Leontyne Price, Richard Pryor, Lou Rawls, Della Reese, Nipsey Russell, Nina Simone, Sly and the Family Stone, The Temptations, Martha and the Vandellas, Ike & Tina Turner, Leslie Uggams, Sarah Vaughan, William Warfield, Dionne Warwick, Dinah Washington, Ethel Waters, Flip Wilson, Jackie Wilson, Nancy Wilson, and Stevie Wonder.

Before his death in a plane crash in December 1967, soul singer Otis Redding had been booked to appear on the show the following year. One telecast included African-American bass-baritone Andrew Frierson singing "Ol' Man River" from Kern and Hammerstein's Show Boat, a song that, at that time, was usually sung on television by white singers, although it was written for a black character in the musical.

However, Sullivan featured "rockers", and gave prominence to black musicians "not without censorship". For instance, he scheduled Fats Domino "at the show's end in case he had to cancel a guest".  He presented Domino alone at his piano singing as if he were a young Nat 'King' Cole or Fats Waller, as he performed "Blueberry Hill". On March 4, 1962, Sullivan presented Domino and his band, who did "Jambalaya", Hank Williams' "You Win Again", and "Let the Four Winds Blow". All seven of Domino's band members were visible to millions of viewers. On December 1, 1957, Sam Cooke performed a complete version of "For Sentimental Reasons". Cooke had been cut off four weeks earlier during a live performance of "You Send Me" as the show's allotted time expired, causing an outrage among television audiences. Sullivan rebooked Cooke for the December 1 show to overwhelming success.

The Muppets

Between 1966 and 1971, Jim Henson performed some of his Muppet characters on the show. The characters made a total of 25 appearances.

Henson's Muppets were introduced on The Ed Sullivan Show on September 18, 1966. Sullivan introduced the characters as "Jim, uh ... Newsom's puppets." The act featured a small ball of fur growing into the Rock and Roll Monster (performed by Jim Henson, Jerry Nelson, and Frank Oz) with three heads and six arms lip-syncing to the unreleased song "Rock It to Me" by The Bruthers. After the act was done, the Rock and Roll Monster shrunk back into the ball of fur which is then eaten by Sour Bird (who was previously used in a commercial for Royal Crown Cola).

Over the next few years, Henson's Muppets made more appearances, with performances including:

 The Art of Visual Thinking (October 2, 1966) – A remake of the skit of the same name from Sam and Friends. Kermit (performed by Jim Henson) teaches Grump (performed by Frank Oz and voiced by Jerry Juhl) about the concept of visualizing thoughts through drawings shown on the TV screen. This sketch was reprised on June 4, 1967.
 Wocka'N'Roll (October 9, 1966) – Joke Runner (performed by Frank Oz)  host a Segment called "Wocka 'N' Rolls" where 2,000 Muppets Come Over Joke Runner And tell a joke One By One.
 Monster Family (October 23, 1966) – Fred (performed by Jim Henson) appears as a father monster talks to his son (performed by Jerry Juhl) about being a monster. A blue version of Splurge (performed by Frank Oz) appears as the mother.
 Java (November 27, 1966) – Two tube-like Muppets (which were designed by Frank Oz) dance to the Al Hirt song "Java". Jim Henson and Frank Oz performed the two puppets and the explosion that provides the punchline was achieved by Jerry Juhl shooting off a fire extinguisher. As the three of them prepared to go onstage that night right before Ed Sullivan introduced them, Jerry Juhl suddenly realized that he left the fire extinguisher in their dressing room which was up on the second floor. Jerry Juhl raced to the elevator hearing the "Java" music through the speakers in the elevator so he knew exactly how much time he had left until it was too late. Jerry Juhl managed to grab the fire extinguisher, run back to the elevator, and make the trip back down to the stage just in time for the climax. This sketch was reprised on May 26, 1968. The act was even done on Stuffed and Unstrung (an evolved counterpart of Puppet Up!).
 Inchworm (November 27, 1966) – Kermit sits on a wall and hums "Glow Worm". Kermit also eats some worms that interrupt him. When it comes to the last one, Kermit grabs it and pulls it, showing how long it is, until it turns out that it happens to be the nose of Big V who ends up eating Kermit.
 Music Hath Charms (January 15, 1967) – Kermit plays the piano with some Muppet Monsters dancing to the music. After the song, the piano comes to life and eats Kermit.
 I've Grown Accustomed to Your Face (February 5, 1967) – Kermit and Yorick from Sam and Friends are featured in this act. Kermit (dressed as a girl) lip-synchs to Rosemary Clooney's cover version as Yorick eats his way out of the handkerchief he is under and then tries to eat Kermit. This was previously done on The Jack Paar Show and later reprised on this show April 21, 1968, and reprised on August 29, 2011, at the D23 Expo by Leslie Carrara-Rudolph (who was operating a rebuilt version of Kermit's pre-frog form) and Brian Henson (who was operating a rebuilt and redesigned version of Yorick). The act was even done on Stuffed and Unstrung (an evolved counterpart of Puppet Up!). Clooney's cover was used for that event.
 I Feel Pretty (April 30, 1967) – The story of an ugly girl named Amanda (performed by Jim Henson) who tries to become beautiful and tries to change her looks using a self-help book in order to gain the affection of Conrad Love (also performed by Jim Henson). Mert from the La Choy commercials and Fred from the Kern's Bakery commercials appear as Amanda's friends where they were performed by Jim Henson and Jerry Juhl (who also voices the narrator) while Frank Oz does the puppeteering.
 Monster Eats Machine (October 8, 1967) – A prototype version of Cookie Monster (performed by Jim Henson) finds a talking machine (voiced by Jim Henson) and eats it while it explains its various parts. After the monster is done eating the machine, its voice is heard from within the monster as it states that nothing can stop it from performing its function, which is to be the most powerful exploding device known to man. On a related note with this sketch, the prototype version of Cookie Monster was previously used as the Wheel-Stealer from the commercial for Wheels, Crowns, and Flutes. The sketch later appeared on The Muppet Show where the Luncheon Counter Monster also ate a machine explaining its functions.
 Rowlf and Jimmy Dean (October 8, 1967) – Jimmy Dean and Rowlf the Dog appear together for the last time and perform "Friendship" while doing the "herd of cows" gag.
 Santa Claus Routine with Arthur Godfrey (December 24, 1967) – Arthur Godfrey plays Santa Claus and gets a visit from a group of monsters consisting of Thudge (performed by Jim Henson), Gleep (a prototype of Grover performed by Frank Oz), Scudge (performed by Jerry Juhl), Snerk and Snork (performed by Frank Oz). They attempt to steal the toys only to learn that Santa Claus has given them the toys. They then sing "It's Christmas Tomorrow".
 Business, Business (February 18, 1968) – Two mean-looking creatures with tube-like necks scat about business while two friendlier creatures scat about values. The Blue Monster and the Orange Creature were performed by Jim Henson while the Green Monster and the Purple Creature were performed by Jerry Juhl. A goof is seen where some hands are shown holding the neck of the creatures.
 The Monster Trash Can Dance (October 13, 1968) – Parts of a monster hide in a trash can as an increasingly suspicious Little Girl Sue wanders by.
 Sclrap Flyapp (November 24, 1968) – A weird-looking creature seen from the neck up randomly blurts out Sclrap Flyapp and uses its nose blast on any creature that does not say "Sclarp Flyapp". A goof is seen when the Sclrap Flyapp creature is blasted at the end, an opening between its head and neck revealed the puppeteer's hand. This sketch was reworked into the Hugga Wugga sketch on The Muppet Show.
 Christmas Reindeer (December 22, 1968) – A bunch of reindeer want snow to fall on Christmas. Dasher and Donner were performed by Jim Henson, Prancer was performed by Frank Oz, Blitzen was performed by Jerry Juhl, and Dancer was performed by Bob Payne. All the reindeer were built by Don Sahlin.
 A Change of Face (March 30, 1969) – Rex Robbins changes the face and personality of the Southern Colonel from the Southern Bread commercials. A similar routine was used with the same puppet on The Muppets on Puppets.
 Happy Girl Meets a Monster (May 11, 1969) – The Beautiful Day Monster (performed by Jim Henson) does all he can to ruin a beautiful day for Little Girl Sue (performed by Jim Henson). Beautiful Day Monster was first seen here before his appearances on Sesame Street and The Muppet Show.

Later performances by the Muppets include:

 Mah Nà Mah Nà (November 30, 1969) – Mahna Mahna (performed by Jim Henson) and the Snowths were featured in this song before it was repeated on The Muppet Show. A goof is seen when Jim Henson's head and arm are seen when Mahna Mahna backs away from the camera.
 Big Bird's Dance (December 14, 1969) – Big Bird dances to "Minuet of the Robots" by Jean-Jacques Perrey while bird watchers watch him. Danny Seagren performed Big Bird here, but had no dialogue, even when Sullivan talked to him.
 Octopus's Garden (March 1, 1970) – An octopus (performed by Frank Oz) constantly interrupts the singing of "Octopus's Garden" by a diver (performed by Jim Henson) by giving out a bunch of bad puns until he receives comeuppance from a hungry giant clam (performed by Frank Oz).
 Come Together (April 12, 1970) – A strange Muppet band sings the classic song by the Beatles while a giant blue and green dancing cowboy slowly falls apart.
 What Kind of Fool Am I? (May 31, 1970) – Kermit tries to sing the song on the piano while Grover continues to interrupt him. Several older Muppets make cameo appearances in the finale of the sketch.
 The Wild String Quartet (January 17, 1971) – Mahna Mahna (performed by Jim Henson) fills in for a violinist named Beagleman, but ends up playing the drums instead, much to the dismay of Harrison (performed by Richard Hunt), Twill (performed by Jerry Nelson) and Grump (performed by Frank Oz). Twill's puppet was recycled from Fred from the Munchos commercials and later used for Zelda Rose in The Muppet Show.
 The Glutton (February 21, 1971) – An incredibly fat man called the Glutton (performed by Jim Henson and assisted by Frank Oz) kept eating things, before being shrunken by a small purple creature and then eaten by a duplicate of himself. After the sketch was over, the Glutton attempted to swallow Ed Sullivan's hand after giving him a handshake.

Broadway
The show is also noteworthy for showcasing performances from numerous classic Broadway musicals of the era, often featuring members of the original Broadway casts. These include:
 West Side Story – Carol Lawrence and Larry Kert singing "Tonight"; the members of the Jets gang performing "Cool".
 My Fair Lady – Julie Andrews singing "I Could Have Danced All Night" and "Wouldn't It Be Loverly?"; Rex Harrison performing "Why Can't the English?"; Stanley Holloway performing "With a Little Bit of Luck; John Michael King singing "On the Street Where You Live"
 Camelot – Richard Burton and Julie Andrews performing an extended scene including the title song and "What Do the Simple Folk Do?"; Robert Goulet singing "If Ever I Would Leave You" and "C'est Moi".
 Show Boat (1961 New York City Center revival) – Andrew Frierson singing "Ol' Man River", and Carol Bruce, from the 1946 Broadway revival, singing "Bill".
 Carnival! – Anna Maria Alberghetti singing "Love Makes the World Go 'Round".
 Bye Bye Birdie – Dick Van Dyke singing "Put On A Happy Face", Chita Rivera singing "Spanish Rose", Paul Lynde singing "Kids" and "Hymn for a Sunday Evening (Ed Sullivan)".
 Oliver! – Georgia Brown singing "As Long as He Needs Me"; Davy Jones singing "Consider Yourself"; Georgia Brown, Davy Jones, Alice Playten, Bruce Prochnik, Clive Revill and the boys singing "I'd Do Anything". The performance was on February 9, 1964 – on the same telecast as The Beatles' first live performance.
 Oklahoma! – John Raitt, Celeste Holm, Florence Henderson and Barbara Cook performing the title song; Celeste Holm (from the original Broadway cast) performing "I Can't Say No".
 Sweet Charity – Gwen Verdon performing "I'm A Brass Band" and "If My Friends Could See Me Now".
 The Roar of the Greasepaint – The Smell of the Crowd – Anthony Newley singing "Who Can I Turn To?".
 Flora the Red Menace – Liza Minnelli singing "All I Need Is One Good Break" and "Sing Happy"
 Flower Drum Song – Pat Suzuki performing "I Enjoy Being a Girl".
 Gentlemen Prefer Blondes – Carol Channing singing "Diamonds Are A Girl's Best Friend".
 Hair – the cast (including Diane Keaton, Melba Moore, Paul Jabara and co-authors Gerome Ragni and James Rado) performing "Aquarius".
 Hello, Dolly! – Pearl Bailey (from the all-black 1967 revamping of the show) performing "Before the Parade Passes By" with the ensemble.
 A performance by Broadway dancer Wayne Lamb
 I Do! I Do! – Gordon MacRae and Carol Lawrence (Broadway replacements for Mary Martin and Robert Preston) singing the title song from the show, and MacRae singing "I Love My Wife" and "My Cup Runneth Over".
 Kiss Me, Kate – Alfred Drake, Patricia Morison, Lisa Kirk, and Harold Lang singing "Another Op'nin' Another Show", "We Open In Venice", and "Wunderbar"
 Man of La Mancha – Richard Kiley singing the title song and "The Impossible Dream"; Joan Diener in a rare television appearance in her stage role as Aldonza/Dulcinea singing "What Does He Want of Me?", most of the cast singing the show's final reprise of "The Impossible Dream"
Cabaret – Joel Grey singing part of "Wilkommen" and Jill Haworth in her stage role as Sally Bowles singing the title song
 Purlie – Melba Moore singing "I Got Love" and "Purlie".
 Wildcat – Lucille Ball and Paula Stewart singing "Hey, Look Me Over"
 You're a Good Man, Charlie Brown – Gary Burghoff, Reva Rose, Bob Balaban, Skip Hinnant, Karen Johnson, and Bill Hinnant singing the title song and "Happiness".
 Ethel Merman also occasionally appeared singing hit songs from the shows that she starred in, including Annie Get Your Gun, Gypsy, Happy Hunting, Panama Hattie, and Anything Goes.
 Hermione Gingold and Maurice Chevalier performed their duet "I Remember It Well" from the 1958 film Gigi, on the show.

Most of these artists performed in the same makeup and costumes that they wore in the shows, often providing the only visual recordings of these performances by the original cast members, since there were no network telecasts of the Tony Awards until 1967. Many performances have been compiled and released on DVD as The Best of Broadway Musicals—Original Cast Performances from The Ed Sullivan Show.

Mental illness program
In a 1958 NEA interview, Sullivan noted his pride about the show's role in improving the public's understanding of mental illness. Sullivan considered his May 17, 1953, telecast to be the single most important episode in the show's first decade. During that show, a salute to Broadway director Joshua Logan, the two men were watching in the wings, and Sullivan asked Logan how he thought the show was doing. According to Sullivan, Logan told him that the show was  becoming "another one of those and-then-I-wrote shows"; Sullivan asked him what he should do about it, and Logan volunteered to talk about his experiences in a mental institution.

Sullivan took him up on the offer, and in retrospect believed that several advances in the treatment of mental illness could be attributed to the resulting publicity, including the repeal of a Pennsylvania law about the treatment of the mentally ill and the granting of funds for the construction of new psychiatric hospitals.

Film clips
Occasionally Sullivan would feature a Hollywood actor introducing a clip from a film in which he or she currently starred. Burt Lancaster made an appearance in 1962, speaking about Robert Stroud, the character he portrayed in Birdman of Alcatraz, and introducing a clip from the film. And although Sir Laurence Olivier personally did not appear on the show, in 1966 Sullivan showed a clip from the Olivier Othello, the film version of which was then currently showing in New York City.

Controversies

Bo Diddley
On November 20, 1955, African American rock 'n' roll singer and guitarist Bo Diddley appeared on The Ed Sullivan Show, only to infuriate Sullivan ("I did two songs and he got mad"). Diddley had been asked to sing Tennessee Ernie Ford's hit "Sixteen Tons," which he agreed. But while the show was on air, he changed his mind and sang "Diddley Daddy".

A reporter, who was present at the time, described what happened:

In his biography, Living Legend, Diddley recalled, "Ed Sullivan says to me in plain words: 'You are the first black boy—quote—that ever double crossed me!' I was ready to fight, because I was a little young dude off the streets of Chicago, an' him callin' me 'black' in them days was as bad as sayin' 'nigger'. My manager says to me 'That's Mr. Sullivan!' I said: 'I don't give a shit about Mr. Sullivan, [h]e don't talk to me like that!' An' so he told me, he says, 'I'll see that you never work no more in show business. You'll never get another TV show in your life!'" Diddley’s perennial revisions make it difficult to determine exactly what happened but the guitarist never did appear on The Ed Sullivan Show again. As for Sullivan's racist comment, it is hard to know what he actually said. However, he always seemed supportive of blacks, not only as entertainers he produced a black vaudeville show early in his career, but also for their church-bred conservative beliefs that conformed to the values he wanted the show to reflect. In Living Legend, Diddley boasts of being the first black person to be on The Ed Sullivan Show, but Sullivan had in fact had black guests as early as 1948. Black celebrities who appeared prior to Diddley include Fletcher Henderson, Ethel Waters, Billy Eckstine, Pearl Bailey, the Ink Spots, Sarah Vaughan, Sammy Davis Jr., Jackie Robinson, Lena Horne, Joe Louis, Eartha Kitt, Sugar Ray Robinson, and the Harlem Globetrotters. Nat King Cole was a frequent guest who had appeared a few weeks prior to Diddley.

A Short Vision
On May 27, 1956, The Ed Sullivan Show presented an animated short film entitled A Short Vision. The short subject showcased an unidentified object that is referred to as it by the narrator. The object flies over Earth. When it passes, the people are asleep except the leaders and the wise men who look up at the object. As the leaders and wise men look up and predators and prey hide in fear, it produces a mushroom cloud in the sky, killing everyone and everything, vaporizing the people, the animals and Earth. After this happens, there remains only a moth and a flame.  The moth flies to the flame, gets vaporized and the flame dies. Thus, marking the end of humanity.

The short film is narrated in the style of the Bible. The animation is derived from mostly still images that produce a terrifying and horrifying moving image of the end of humanity.   Just before CBS showed the film, Sullivan assured children that what they would see was an animated fantasy. He told the audience that "It is grim, but I think we can all stand it to realize that in war there is no winner". The film gained notoriety from the show; but it also gained controversy because of it, due to the graphic way it depicted the horrors of a nuclear confrontation. Its graphic images also caused controversy. One of the visuals in the film depicted an animated character's eyes imploding and the remains running down its cheeks and then it gets destroyed by the object.

According to some sources, including contemporary newspaper reports, Ed Sullivan's telecast of A Short Vision caused a reaction as significant as Orson Welles' The War of the Worlds radio broadcast 20 years prior. Because of the popularity of the short film, The Ed Sullivan Show broadcast it again on June 10 of the same year. Sullivan—who in an interview after the first showing erroneously claimed that he had warned children to not watch it—asked adults to remove children from the room before watching the second, heavily publicized showing.

Buddy Holly and the Crickets
On January 26, 1958, for their second appearance on The Ed Sullivan Show, Buddy Holly and The Crickets were scheduled to perform two songs. Sullivan wanted the band to substitute a different song for their record hit "Oh, Boy!", which he felt was too raucous. Holly had already told his hometown friends in Texas that he would be singing "Oh, Boy!" for them, and told Sullivan as much. During the afternoon the Crickets were summoned to rehearsal at short notice, but only Holly was in their dressing room. When asked where the others were, Holly replied, "I don't know. No telling." Sullivan then turned to Holly and said "I guess The Crickets are not too excited to be on The Ed Sullivan Show", to which Holly caustically replied, "I hope they're damn more excited than I am."

Sullivan, already bothered by the choice of songs, was now even angrier. He cut the Crickets' act from two songs to one, and when introducing them mispronounced Holly's name, so it came out vaguely as "Hollett" or "Holland". In addition, Sullivan saw to it that the microphone for Holly's electric guitar was turned off. Holly tried to compensate by singing as loudly as he could, and repeatedly trying to turn up the volume on his guitar. For the instrumental break he cut loose with a dramatic solo, making clear to the audience that the technical fault was not his. The band was received so well that Sullivan was forced to invite them back for a third appearance. Holly's response was that Sullivan did not have enough money. Film of the performance survives; photographs taken that day show Sullivan looking angry and Holly smirking and perhaps ignoring Sullivan.

Jackie Mason
On October 18, 1964, Jackie Mason allegedly gave Sullivan the finger on air. A tape of the incident shows Mason doing his stand-up comedy act and then looking toward Sullivan, commenting that Sullivan was signaling him. Sullivan was reportedly letting Mason know (by pointing two fingers) that he had only two minutes left, as CBS was about to cut away to show a speech by President Lyndon Johnson. Mason began working his own fingers into his act and pointed toward Sullivan with his middle finger slightly separated. After Mason left the stage, the camera then cut to a visibly angry Sullivan.

Sullivan argued with Mason backstage, then terminated his contract. Mason denied knowingly giving Sullivan the middle finger, and Mason later claimed that he had never even heard of the gesture at that time. In retaliation, to protect the perceived threat to his career, Mason filed a libel suit at the New York Supreme Court, which he won.

Sullivan publicly apologized to Mason when he appeared on the show two years later, in 1966. At that time, Mason opened his monologue by saying, "It's a great thrill and a fantastic opportunity to see me in person again," and impersonated Sullivan during his act.  Mason later appeared on the show five times: April 23, 1967; Feb. 25, 1968; Nov. 24, 1968; Jul. 22, 1969; and Aug. 31, 1969.

Bob Dylan
 
Bob Dylan was slated to make his first nationwide American television appearance on The Ed Sullivan Show on May 12, 1963, and intended to perform "Talkin' John Birch Paranoid Blues", a song he wrote lampooning the John Birch Society and the red-hunting paranoia associated with it.  Although Sullivan reportedly liked the song, during the afternoon rehearsal that day CBS officials told Dylan they had deemed the song unacceptable for broadcast and wanted him to substitute another. "No; this is what I want to do," Dylan responded. "If I can't play my song, I'd rather not appear on the show."  He then left the studio rather than altering the act, with Sullivan respecting his decision.

The Doors

The Doors were notorious for their appearance on the show. CBS network censors demanded that before the band performed the song on-camera on September 17, 1967 (Since the beginning of the fall 1966 television season, the show had been recorded on color videotape a few hours before its 8:00 pm Eastern Standard Time time slot.  Performers and their managers were told that the show must proceed as if it were being done live, and videotape editing on short notice was impossible), lead singer Jim Morrison change the lyrics to their hit single "Light My Fire" by altering the line, "Girl, we couldn't get much higher", as they were uncomfortable with the possible reference to drugs.

During the rehearsal, Morrison sang the alternate line (which was either "Girl, we couldn't get much better" or "Girl, there's nothing I require", depending on the source).  However, he reverted to the original line during the show, and CBS executives were powerless to change it because the nature of videotape editing in 1967 required many hours of labor. The Doors were never invited back to the show. According to Ray Manzarek, the band was told, "Mr. Sullivan liked you boys. He wanted you on six more times. ... You'll never do the Sullivan show again." Morrison replied with glee, "Hey man, we just did the Sullivan show."—at the time, an appearance was a hallmark of success.

Manzarek has given differing accounts of what happened. He has said that the band only pretended to agree to change the line but also that Morrison was nervous and simply forgot to change the line. The performance and incident were reenacted in Oliver Stone's 1991 biographical film, The Doors, albeit in a more dramatic fashion, with Morrison portrayed as emphasizing the word "higher".

Sullivan apparently felt the damage had been done and relented on bands using the word "higher". Sly & the Family Stone later appeared on the show and performed their 1969 hit "I Want to Take You Higher."

The Rolling Stones
In contrast, the Rolling Stones were instructed to change the title of their "Let's Spend the Night Together" single for the band's January 15, 1967, appearance. The band complied, with Mick Jagger and Bill Wyman ostentatiously rolling their eyes heavenward whenever they reached the song's one-night-only, clean refrain, "Let's spend 'some time' together". Mick Jagger did not wear a jacket on their first appearance on the show (October 25, 1964) and this annoyed Sullivan.  They were asked to appear again, but they were asked to wear jackets for their 1965 appearance.  The Stones ultimately played on the Ed Sullivan Show six times.

Ratings history
 1948–1949: N/A
 1949–1950: N/A
 1950–1951: #15, 3,723,000 viewers
 1951–1952: N/A
 1952–1953: N/A
 1953–1954: #17, 8,580,000 viewers
 1954–1955: #5, 12,157,200 viewers
 1955–1956: #3, 13,785,500 viewers
 1956–1957: #2, 14,937,600 viewers
 1957–1958: #27, 11,444,160 viewers
 1958–1959: N/A
 1959–1960: #12, 12,810,000 viewers
 1960–1961: #15, 11,800,000 viewers
 1961–1962: #19, 11,381,525 viewers
 1962–1963: #14, 12,725,900 viewers
 1963–1964: #8, 14,190,000 viewers
 1964–1965: #16, 13,280,400 viewers
 1965–1966: #18, 12,493,200 viewers
 1966–1967: #13, 12,569,640 viewers
 1967–1968: #13, 13,147,440 viewers
 1968–1969: #23, 12,349,000 viewers
 1969–1970: #27, 11,875,500 viewers
 1970–1971: N/A

Highlights:

9/09/1956: Elvis Presley's first appearance yielding an 82.6 percentage share, the highest in television history for any program up to the present.  Viewers: 60.710,000  Source: Broadcasting and Telecasting, October 1956 as per ARB the precursor of Nielsen.

2/09/1964: The Beatles's first appearance yielding a 45.3 rating.  Viewers: 73.7 million Source:  Nielsen.

Other noteworthy ratings:

02/16/1964: 43.8 rating   The Beatles's second appearance. Source: Nielsen.

09/09/1956: 43.7 rating Elvis Presley's first appearance.  Source: Trendex.

Primetime specials

Parodies
The show's immense popularity has been the target of numerous tributes and parodies. These include:

 Will Jordan was best known for his uncanny impersonation of Sullivan as the show's host.
 Numerous music videos, such as Billy Joel's "Tell Her About It" (featuring Will Jordan as Sullivan), Nirvana's "In Bloom", Grinspoon's "Hold On Me", Outkast's "Hey Ya!", the Red Hot Chili Peppers's "Dani California" and Bring Me the Horizon's "Drown" have all parodied the show's visual style.
 Rain: A Tribute to the Beatles open their concerts with prerecorded footage of a man doing an intentionally poor Sullivan impression in black and white and then introducing the band, which plays the first part of the show with an exact recreation of the set the Beatles used.
 All You Need Is Cash (1978), a mockumentary about a fictional group, The Rutles. The film contains original footage of Sullivan introducing The Beatles with some audio redubbed for comedic effect.
 The Fab Four, a Beatles tribute act hosted by an Ed Sullivan impressionist.
 One of the characters in Lancelot Link, Secret Chimp, a children's live action TV series with a cast of chimpanzees dubbed by actors' speaking voices, is "Ed Simian", a parody of Sullivan.
 Comedian George Carlin included a routine titled Ed Sullivan Self Taught on his 1972 album FM & AM.
 John Byner, actor and impressionist, included a Sullivan imitation in his repertoire.
 On an episode of The Colgate Comedy Hour, Dean Martin and Jerry Lewis did a parody called The Toast of the Colgate Town, with Lewis wearing fake teeth and slicked-back hair as "Ed Solomon".
 In the episode "Harry Canary" in the animated series Dumb and Dumber, it was named "The Earvin Mulligan Show" as Lloyd's family were performing in the late 60s as "The Happy Dunne Family".
 The first episode of the Late Show with David Letterman on August 30, 1993, featured clips of Ed Sullivan spliced together to make it look as though he was introducing host David Letterman, while a segment later in the episode featured David channeling the "ghost" of Ed Sullivan, this time an archive clip of Sullivan introducing actor Paul Newman, who was live in the Letterman audience that night. Since moving to CBS from NBC, Letterman taped his show in the Ed Sullivan Theater, the studio where Sullivan also staged his program, until his 2015 retirement.
 The Tom Hanks–directed film That Thing You Do! has the Beatles-esque band The Wonders performing in The Hollywood Television Showcase, complete with a caption over the band's lead singer similar to Lennon's "Sorry Girls! He's Married!" The scene was shot at CBS Television City in Los Angeles, which Sullivan used for his West Coast shows.
 The 1954 film White Christmas features a pivotal scene that occurs on "The Ed Harrison Show", which was intentionally similar to Sullivan's show.
 The 1960s animated television series The Flintstones featured a parody of Sullivan as "Ed Sulleystone" on the episode "Itsy Fred".  On the episode called "Lola Brickada", Sullivan was referred to as "Ed Stonevan". Sullivan is also seen introducing "Roc Roll" in another episode, but his name is not mentioned.  And in the episode where Fred brings home a lion cub, Barney performs a trick with the now grown up lion and mentioned that he saw a similar stunt on the "Ed Shalevan" show.
 On the animated sitcom The Jetsons, "Fred Solarvan" introduces Gina Lola Jupiter, causing George Jetson to order his son Elroy to leave the room and do his geometry homework tapes. After Elroy leaves, George sets his receiver to 3-D viewing, causing Gina to seemingly to pop out of the TV set.
 Gabe Kaplan did a comedy skit in the 1970s (also featured on his 1974 album Holes and Mellow Rolls as "Ed Sullivan, Ed Sullivan"), that had him impersonate a drunken Sullivan on his final show, being nasty in general to his audience and guest stars, and finally saying good night to the audience.
 The 1994 film Pulp Fiction features a scene in a 50s–60s-themed restaurant where Jerome Patrick Hoban does an imitation of Ed Sullivan introducing acts.
 The direct-to-video children's film The Wiggles: You Make Me Feel Like Dancing! includes a video for the song "Shimmy Shake" which depicts the group appearing on The Ed Sullivan Show. Paul Paddick portrayed Sullivan for the video.
 In the manga series One Piece, an omake was drawn in which the Straw Hat Pirates, along with other prominent characters, are all tied into one large fiasco that ends with a party. It is called The Ed Sullivan Show only in name.
 In Tom Dudzick's 2002 play, Over the Tavern, set in 1959, 12 year-old Rudy Pansicki regularly rehearses his Ed Sullivan impression, with emphasis on Sullivan's supposed pronunciation of "show" as "shoe".
 The Broadway musical Jersey Boys features a scene where Four Seasons band member Tommy DeVito imitates Sullivan introducing "Topo Gigio and the Vienna Boys Choir" before bringing Frankie Valli on stage for the first time.
 The Ramones used a segment of Ed Sullivan shaking Buddy Holly's hand on The Ed Sullivan Show for their music video for "Do You Remember Rock 'n' Roll Radio?"
 On South Park, in the episode "Terrance and Phillip: Behind the Blow", black and white footage is shown of Terrance and Philip appearing on the show as children.
 On The Tonight Show, Johnny Carson sometimes invoked a Sullivan impression, quoting Sullivan's oft-used introduction "Right here on our stage..."
 In an episode of Modern Madcaps titled "Cool Cat Blues" (1961), The Cat must stop a rival network from kidnapping "Ed Solvent", who maintained his rigid, stoic on-air demeanor by freezing himself in a block of ice before each show. Will Jordan provided the voice of Solvent 
 A 1972 ABC summer series "The Kopykats" featured a sketch in which Will Jordan as Sullivan announces he's hired a stand-in for himself. The entire cast (which included Rich Little, Frank Gorshin, Edie Adams) portrayed a staff & crew who all sounded like Sullivan. When the "stand-in" is introduced, it's Sullivan himself... but his version of himself bombs.
In the 1984 mockumentaryThis Is Spinal Tap, the band is shown in archival footage playing an Ed Sullivan-like television show.

References

Bibliography
 Garner, Joe (2002). Stay Tuned: Television's Unforgettable Moments. Kansas City: Andrews McMeel Publishing, .
 
 Nachman, Gerald. Right Here on Our Stage Tonight!: Ed Sullivan's America. Berkeley, California: University of California Press; 2009.  p. 331.
 Ilson, Bernie. Sundays with Sullivan: How the Ed Sullivan Show brought Elvis, the Beatles and Culture to America. Lanham, Maryland: Taylor Trade Publishing, (2009).  pp. 115–118 (entire chapter devoted to Marlo Lewis).
 John Leonard; Claudia Falkenburg & Andrew Solt, eds.. A Really Big Show: A Visual History of the Ed Sullivan Show. New York: Sarah Lazin/Viking Studio Books; 1992. .
 James Maguire. Impresario: The Life and Times of Ed Sullivan. New York: Billboard Books; 2006. .

External links

 The Official Ed Sullivan Show Website
 
 The Ed Sullivan Show at the Museum of Broadcast Communications
 
 
 Monica Lewis on the very first 1948 telecast
 The Ed Sullivan Show at TV Guide
 SOFA Entertainment
 Ed Sullivan: 40 Incredible Guests —a slideshow by Life magazine

1948 American television series debuts
1971 American television series endings
1940s American music television series
1950s American music television series
1960s American music television series
1970s American music television series
1940s American variety television series
1950s American variety television series
1960s American variety television series
1970s American variety television series
Bill Haley
Black-and-white American television shows
CBS original programming
English-language television shows
Peabody Award-winning television programs
Television programmes about the Beatles
Primetime Emmy Award for Outstanding Variety Series winners
American live television series
Television shows filmed in New York City